Over the course of her 50-year-long film career, American actress Karen Black received numerous critical accolades for her performances in films and theater. In 1965, she received a nomination for Best Actress by the New York Drama Critics' Circle for her Broadway performance in The Playroom. She later garnered critical acclaim for her performance in the film Five Easy Pieces (1970), for which she was nominated for an Academy Award for Best Supporting Actress, and for which she won a Golden Globe Award. Black won her second Golden Globe for Best Supporting Actress for her portrayal of Myrtle Wilson in The Great Gatsby (1974). The following year, she earned her third Golden Globe nomination, this time in the category of Best Actress, for her role in The Day of the Locust (1975). Black was also nominated for a Grammy Award for her songwriting and singing on the soundtrack for Nashville (1975), in which she starred as a glamorous country singer.

Academy Awards
The Academy Awards are a set of awards given by the Academy of Motion Picture Arts and Sciences annually for excellence of cinematic achievements.

Chicago Alt.film Fest
The Chicago Alt.film Fest is a film festival held in Chicago which screens and celebrates achievements in independent and experimental cinema.

Fangoria Chainsaw Awards
The Fangoria Chainsaw Awards are an award ceremony focused on horrors and thriller films, inaugurated in 1992.

Golden Globe Awards
The Golden Globe Award is bestowed by the members of the Hollywood Foreign Press Association (HFPA) recognizing excellence in film and television, both domestic and foreign.

Grammy Awards
The Grammy Awards are presented annually by The Recording Academy to recognize achievements in the music industry.

Hermosa Beach Film Festival Award
The Hermosa Beach Film Festival Award is held annually in Hermosa Beach, Florida.

National Board of Review
The National Board of Review was founded in 1909 in New York City to award "film, domestic and foreign, as both art and entertainment".

New York Drama Critics' Circle
The New York Drama Critics' Circle awards is made up of 19 drama critics from daily newspapers, magazines and wire services based in the New York City metropolitan area.

New York Film Critics Circle
Founded in 1935, the New York Film Critics Circle (NYFCC) is an American film critics' organization founded in 1935, and whose membership includes over 30 film critics from New York-based daily and weekly newspapers, magazines, online publications.

Sitges Film Festival
Founded in 1968, the Sitges Film Festival is an international film festival held annually in Spain, screening and celebrating achievements in fantasy and horror films.

Notes

References

External links
Karen Black awards at IMDb

Lists of awards received by American actor
Lists of awards received by American musician